Castle Old Fort is a small Iron Age hill fort in Stonnall, in the Metropolitan borough of Walsall, West Midlands, England. Its interior is now occupied by a house.

The structure is a promontory fort in that it is situated on the southern side of Castle Hill, presumably enabling its occupiers to overlook the southern approach of the ancient highway, Chester Road.

It has an earth rampart surrounded by a ditch, with an entrance in the south east. There is some evidence that there may originally have been a second line of defences comprising a bank and a ditch.

The seventeenth century archaeologist Robert Plot reported findings of flint arrowheads, Roman pottery and Roman coins of Otho, Domitian and Nero, and the existence of a second entrance in the north west of the fort, in an area that has since been destroyed by quarrying.

References

Hill forts in the West Midlands (county)
Iron Age sites in England